The Sinnemahoning Path is an ancient trail which passes through what will be called Keating on its way to the upper Alleghenies. The Sinnemahoning Path followed the West Branch of the Susquehanna from  “the Great Island” at Lock Haven to the Sinnemahoning Creek at Keating, to Portage Creek, then to Canoe Place near Port Allegany, Pennsylvania and on to the Seneca country in the upper Alleghenies.

On February 9, 1950, the Pennsylvania Historical and Museum Commission dedicated three state historic markers noting the historic importance of the Sinnemahoning Path, with two in Cameron County and one in Clinton County.

References

Native American trails in the United States
Historic trails and roads in Pennsylvania
Native American history of Pennsylvania